Operation Slapshot is the code name of an undercover police operation, spearheaded by New Jersey state police, against an illegal nationwide gambling ring.

Details
The operation was made public on February 6, 2006. Rick Tocchet, an assistant coach for the Phoenix Coyotes, a team in the National Hockey League, and Janet Jones, the wife of ice hockey and NHL great Wayne Gretzky, were among those under investigation or indicted with charges pertaining to the operation.  Also under investigation was suspended state trooper James Harney, who was allegedly Tocchet's partner in the operation.

The investigation also referred to the possibility of an NHL team owner, half a dozen active NHL players, and other coaches and team staff members being involved in this investigation.  As of February 8, 2006, two more names were mentioned as people implicated by law enforcement officials: San Jose Sharks center Jeremy Roenick, and Toronto Maple Leafs center Travis Green.

The ring was said to allegedly have ties to the Bruno-Scarfo crime family, which has a base of operations in and around Philadelphia, Pennsylvania and southern New Jersey.

Pleas and sentences
On August 3, 2006, former New Jersey state trooper James Harney pleaded guilty to conspiracy, promoting gambling and official misconduct, and promised to help authorities with their case against Tocchet and others. Harney said that he and Tocchet were 50–50 partners in the betting ring. Harney was sentenced to six years in prison on August 3, 2007.

On December 1, 2006, James Ulmer, 41, of Swedesboro, New Jersey pleaded guilty to conspiracy and promoting gambling, and agreed to cooperate with authorities.

On May 25, 2007, Tocchet pled guilty to conspiracy and promoting gambling and was placed on probation for two years for his role in Operation Slapshot, and avoided jail time.  He was allowed to return to active duty in February, provided he refrains from gambling in any way in the future. He must also submit himself to NHL-NHLPA doctors to see if he has an issue with compulsive gambling.

References

2005–06 NHL season
Sports betting scandals
Ice hockey controversies